The James Wadsworth Rossetter House is a historic home in the U.S. located at 1320 Highland Avenue, Melbourne, Florida. The original address of the home was 1328 Houston Street. On July 27, 2005, it was added to the U.S. National Register of Historic Places. The house is owned by The Rossetter House Foundation, Inc., managed by the Florida Historical Society, and part of the Historic Rossetter House Museum.

References

Gallery

External links
Weekly List of Actions Taken on Properties: 7/25/05 Through 7/29/05 at National Register of Historic Places

Web Articles
"Rossetter House Historical Marker Dedication", October 15, 2006 by Florida Historical Society. This article contains pictures of the house and historical marker.

Eau Gallie, Florida
Houses in Brevard County, Florida
National Register of Historic Places in Brevard County, Florida
Buildings and structures in Melbourne, Florida
1860s establishments in Florida
Houses completed in the 19th century